Nestorov Island is the 374 m long in southeast-northwest direction and 120 m wide rocky island with surface area of  lying off the northeast coast of Coronation Island in the South Orkney Islands, Antarctica. It is “named after Captain Ivan Nestorov (1942-2001) who compiled a 1985 report on the Southwest Atlantic fisheries (including South Georgia and South Orkneys areas) commissioned by the management of the company Ocean Fisheries – Burgas and based on his experience gained while in command of the fishing trawler Argonavt and on Soviet and Polish data. The Bulgarian fishermen, along with those of the Soviet Union, Poland and East Germany are the pioneers of modern Antarctic fishing industry.”

Location
British mapping in 1963.

Maps
 British Antarctic Territory: South Orkney Islands. Scale 1:100000 topographic map. DOS Series 510. Surrey, England: Directorate of Overseas Surveys, 1963
 Antarctic Digital Database (ADD). Scale 1:250000 topographic map of Antarctica. Scientific Committee on Antarctic Research (SCAR). Since 1993, regularly upgraded and updated

Notes

References
 Nestorov Island. SCAR Composite Gazetteer of Antarctica

External links
 Nestorov Island. Copernix satellite image

 

Islands of the South Orkney Islands
Ocean Fisheries – Burgas Co
Bulgaria and the Antarctic